Motilal Oswal Financial Services Limited is an Indian financial services company offering a range of financial products and services. The company was founded by Motilal Oswal and Raamdeo Agrawal in 1987.

The company is listed on BSE and NSE stock exchanges.

History
Motilal Oswal Financial Services Ltd (MOFSL) was set up by Motilal Oswal and Raamdeo Agrawal as a broking house in 1987.

The company entered into investment banking in 2005, followed by private equity fund in 2006.

In February 2006, Motilal Oswal Financial Services Ltd. acquired Peninsular Capital Markets, a Cochin, Kerala based broking company for Rs. 35 crore. The company tied up with State Bank of India in 2006, Punjab National Bank in 2007  and Axis Bank in 2013 to offer online trading to its customers.

In January 2010, Motilal Oswal Financial Services Ltd. set up Mutual fund business named as Motilal Oswal Asset Management Company (MOAMC).

In 2013, Motilal Oswal Financial Services Ltd. established Aspire Home Finance Corporation Limited (AHFCL). The company offers loans for home, construction, composite, improvement, and extension in India.

Management
 Motilal Oswal – Co-founder, MD & CEO of MOFSL
 Raamdeo Agrawal – Co-founder & Chairman of MOFSL & MOAMC
 Abhijit Tare – CEO, Investment Banking Business

Listings and Shareholdings 
The equity shares of Motilal Oswal Financial Services are listed on the Bombay Stock Exchange, and the National Stock Exchange of India.

Products and services
Motilal Oswal provides products and services related to equity trading, commodity trading and investment advisory services, IPOs and SIPs investment, portfolio management services, and mutual funds investment.

Milestones
 1987 – Founded in Mumbai by Motilal Oswal and Raamdeo Agrawal
 1990 – Listed on BSE
 1994 – Listed on NSE
 2007 – Went public via IPO; Featured as a case study in Harvard Business School.
 2010 – Launched Motilal Oswal Foundation

Controversies
Motilal Oswal along with few other top brokers have been accused of various irregularities on NSEL case. Agencies including EOW-Mumbai and SFIO have found the top 5 brokers including Motilal Oswal guilty of misselling NSEL contracts, KYC manipulation, client code modification, benami transactions & infusion of black money through their NBFCs on the Exchange platform. The EOW had arrested senior employees of three brokerages namely IIFL, Geofin Comtrade & Anand Rathi in March, 2015. This was followed by the market regulator, SEBI issuing multiple show-cause notices to the brokers in 2016, 2017, 2018 & 2019 respectively. The EOW-Mumbai in its supplementary charge sheet has also accused the three brokerages IIFL, Motilal Oswal & Anand Rathi of cheating clients. Based on the recommendations of SFIO & EOW's report against misdeeds of brokers, SEBI declared Motilal Oswal along with India Infoline Commodities (IIFL) ‘not fit and proper’ as commodity derivative brokers, in the last week of February 2019.

In May 2022, SEBI imposed a fine of INR 2.5 million on Motilal Oswal for misutilization of client funds and incorrect reporting of margins.

Awards and recognitions
 Mr. Motilal Oswal, Chairman & MD is awarded as Outstanding Institution Builder of the year in The AIMA Managing India Awards
 Motilal Oswal wins GOLD for marketing effectiveness at the Global ACEF customer engagement awards (Awarded for Think Equity. Think Motilal Oswal TV Ad) 
 Motilal Oswal TV Ad wins 3 awards at the ABBY Awards for Creative Excellence
 Motilal Oswal Financial Services Ltd wins the Brand of the Year Award at the CNBC TV18 - India Business Leadership Awards
 MOFSL won the ‘Best Domestic Brokerage India’ and many other recognitions at the Asia Money Brokers Poll 2021.
 MOFSL was bestowed the ‘Business Leadership Award’ for excellence in franchising and business development at the Franchise India Awards 2019.
 MOAMC got listed among ‘Asia’s Top 100 Money Managers’ for 2017 by the Institutional Investor magazine.
 MOFSL has been featured in Forbes Super 50 Companies 2017
 Motilal Oswal Securities received two awards for its equity research in IT and commodity (forex) segments at India's Best Market Analyst Awards 2014, India's biggest Financial Market Awards also called as ZEE Business Awards 2014.
Motilal Oswal Financial Services Ltd's Analyst Mr. Jinesh Gandhi won the Best Market Analyst Award for the categories Equity-Auto at ‘India's Best Market Analyst Awards 2013 organized by Zee Business.
 Motilal Oswal Securities got awarded with the ‘Best Performing National Financial Advisor Equity Broker’ award in 2010 as well as 2012 at the CNBC TV18 Financial Advisor Awards.
 CNBC TV18 awarded Motilal Oswal the Best Performing Equity Broker Award in 2010 at CNBC TV18 Financial Advisor Awards 2010 
 Motilal Oswal IB team won the Asia Pacific Cross Border Deal of the year award in 2010 and the CEO Ashutosh Maheshvari got India M&A Investment Banker of the Year award 
 Motilal Oswal Securities Ltd. rated as No.1 Broker in ET Now – Starmine Analyst Awards 2009.

References

External links
 Motilal Oswal
 Motilal Oswal Mutual Funds

Financial services companies based in Mumbai
Brokerage firms
Indian companies established in 1987
1987 establishments in Maharashtra
Financial services companies established in 1987
Companies listed on the National Stock Exchange of India
Companies listed on the Bombay Stock Exchange